Lydford may refer to:

Geographical
Lydford, A village in Devon.
Lydford railway station
Lydford Gorge, a gorge on the River Lyd (Devon) near Lydford
Lydford-on-Fosse, a village in Somerset

Biographical
Harold Lydford, Royal Air Force air marshal